Christian Petersen may refer to:

 Christian Petersen (sculptor) (1885–1961), Danish-born American sculptor and university teacher
 Christian Petersen (ice hockey) (1937–2009), Norwegian ice hockey player
 Christian G. Petersen, footballer
 Christian T. Petersen, game designer